Aurora Reyes Flores (born in Hidalgo del Parral, September 9, 1908 – Mexico City, April 26, 1985) was a Mexican artist, known as a painter and writer, and she was the first female muralist in Mexico and first exponent of Mexican muralism. She also went by the name Aurora Reyes.

Life 
Reyes was the daughter of the soldier León Reyes and his wife Luisa Flores. Her grandfather was general Bernardo Reyes, and her uncle Alfonso Reyes was also a well-known writer and scholar.

Shortly after the outbreak of the revolution, due to the political persecution, her family fled to Mexico City. After the situation calmed down, Reyes joined the Escuela Nacional Preparatoria at the age of 13 years, and afterward she visited the Escuela Nacional de Bellas Artes until 1924. She married the journalist Jorge Godoy, gave birth to her son Héctor in 1926, and shortly after the divorce of her husband in 1931, she bore her second son Jorge.

She had a love interest in Cuban poet Nicolás Guillén. Despite her artistic success and outspoken personality, she died nearly forgotten.

Reyes had relationships with artist that she would parallel with. Reyes had a strong friendship with Frida Kahlo. They were classmates at the Escuela Nacional Prepatoria in the early 1920s, however, Reyes was expelled shortly after enrolling. Her expulsion did not keep them apart, photos captured them together and happy. They remained friends for the rest of their lives. They were important to each other, so much so that Reyes took part as part of the honor guard at Kahlo’s funeral. Another friendship that Reyes had was with Concha Michel, this friendship flourished when Kahlo got married in the late 1920s.

Art 
She is the first female Mexican-born muralist and a distinguished writer.  From 1921 to 1923, she was a student at the Escuela Nacional de Bellas Artes.  She had her first solo exhibition at the ARS Gallery in 1925.  She exhibited her work at the Salón de la Plástica Mexicana and participated in collective exhibitions in France, Cuba, the United States and Mexico.

In 1927, she began teaching drawing and painting for the Secretariat of Public Education, from which she retired in 1964.

She created seven murals in her lifetime.  In 1936, she completed a mural called “Atentado a los maestros rurales” (Attack on Rural Schoolteachers) at the Centro Escolar Revolución.  This mural showed how capitalism was at the core of brutality in the Mexican society. In 1937 Reyes painted the Woman of War. In this painting it shows a woman ready to participate in the war due to her deceased child. The child was a victim of war since the mother lost her child she has nothing left and is ready to fight.  Between 1960 and 1972 she painted another four murals in the Auditorium of 15th May of the Sindicato Nacional de Trabajadores de la Educación (SNTE). In 1978 she finished her sixth mural at the Hernán Cortés house in Coyoacán.

Her literary works include Nueve estancias en el desierto, Humanos paisajes, and Espiral en retorno. She received awards for her poetry.

Politics 
Reyes was outspoken and very political, earning the nickname “Magnolia Iracunda” (Fiery Magnolia) . Her family’s time in Mexico City left them very poor which later influenced her politics.   She was member of the Partido Comunista Mexicano, a founding member of the Liga de Escritores y Artistas Revolucionarios and of the Confederación Nacional Campesina. Reyes was also a member of the Enseñanza de la República Mexicana in which see defended the rights and participation of women in government and teaching positions. Reyes was also part of other issues. She fought for women’s right to vote and their right to hold elected civil posts, an extension on maternity leave and recognition of breastfeeding time for mothers of young children.  She also promoted the creation of daycare centers for the children of schoolteachers.

In 1960 she participated with other intellectuals in a hunger strike on behalf of political prisoners in Mexico.  In 1968, she participated in the student uprising, which forced her into hiding at the La Castañeda psychiatric hospital for a time.

References

External links 

 Aurora Reyes (Spanish)Tuvo dos hijos, Héctor, a quien reconoció el periodista Jorge de Godoy cuando se casó con Aurora, y Jorge, quien nace fruto de esa unión.
 Aurora Reyes Flores chronicle at El Barrio Antiguo
 Aurora Reyes Flores Murals
 Aurora Reyes Flores Article at Revistas Unam
 Proceso Article about Aurora Reyes Flores
 Aurora Reyes Flores Exhibit at El Museo Regional del Valle del Fuerte

1908 births
1985 deaths
20th-century Mexican painters
20th-century Mexican women artists
Mexican muralists
People from Parral, Chihuahua
Mexican communists
Mexican women painters
Women muralists